Bearhatty is a panchayat village in Coonoor Taluk of the Nilgiris District, Tamil Nadu, India.

References

External links
http://www.gloriousindia.com/unleashed/place.php?id=257761

Villages in Nilgiris district